Afshar ( افشار; , Afşar;  اوْوشار) is a tribe of Oghuz Turkic origin, that split into several groups in Iran, Turkey and Afghanistan.

During the Seljuk conquests of the 11th century, they moved from Central Asia into the Middle East. They are noted in history for being one of the Qizilbash tribes that helped establish the Safavid dynasty of Iran, and for being the source of descent of Iran's Afsharid dynasty. Nader Shah, who became the monarch of Iran in 1736, was from the Qereklu tribe of Afshars. Afshars mainly inhabit Iran, where they remain a largely nomadic group.

Today, the Afshars are variously grouped as a branch of the Azerbaijanis and Turkmens or Turkomans (a common general term used for people of Oghuz Turkic origin).

The founders of the Germiyanids, Baku Khanate, Zanjan Khanate, Khalkhal Khanate, and Urmia Khanate were also of Afshar descent. The founder of the Karamanids may have also been of Afshar descent.

According to Rashid-al-Din Hamadani, Afshar, the eponymous founder of the tribe, was a son of Yildiz Khan, the third son of Oghuz Khan. Afshar means "obedient".

History
Kashgari mentioned the Afshar tribe sixth in his list of 22 Oghuz Turkic sub-tribes, and pointed out that the sub-tribal names are those of their ancestors "who gave birth to them in older times".

In the 11th century, the first Afshar tribesmen entered Iran and Anatolia from Transoxania along with other Oghuz invaders. More members of the Afshar tribe may have arrived during the Mongol conquests during the second half of the 13th century. For a period afterwards, the Afshar tribe is untraceable in historic records as a distinct group, for they are subsumed under label of Turkoman. Furthermore, it seems that the different Turkoman elements were subject to diverse re-grouping processes, insofar that when new "tribes" came into existence, only some were able to maintain traditional Oghuz tribal names, such as "Afshar".

Georg Stöber explains that in the political environment of the time the ranking of the different groups supported by (constructed) genealogies became increasingly important. Rashid al-Din Hamadani (died 1318) believed that the ancestor of the tribe was a person named "Afshar", who in turn was genealogically linked to the hero Oghuz. The Afshar tribe were also said to be part of the right wing (bozuq) of the Oghuz army.

In the 12th century, two governors (father and son) from the Afshar tribe held Khuzistan (southwestern Iran) for 40 years. The Karamanid dynasty, who held sway in the Middle Taurus (modern-day Turkey), may have been of Afshar descent. Afshar tribesmen are said to have belonged to nomadic groups in the region of Sivas, and the tribe was part of the Ak Koyunlu Turkoman tribal confederacy.

In later years, many Afshars moved to the east, where, as part of the Qizilbash, they aided in establishing the Safavid dynasty of Iran. Other Afshars remained in Anatolia however, which at the time was Ottoman soil. There, on Ottoman soil, they formed separate groups. During the 19th century nomads in the Çukurova, who were known to migrate between Syria in the winter and Anatolia in summer, were forcibly settled by the Ottoman Darwish Pasha in the area of Göksun and Kayseri; in the mid-twentieth century, villagers of Afshar descent could still be found in the vicinity of the latter two areas.

The eastward movement of the Afshars from Anatolia is connected to the foundation of Iran's Safavid dynasty. The Afshars were part of the Qizilbash that served Shah Ismail I, the founder of the dynasty. The individual Qizilbash tribes were in all likelihood not groups of common descent but composites, and were followers of a chief, of mixed origin, and were not necessarily all Turkomans. Stöber therefore explains that it is impossible to regard the Afshars of the 16th century as direct genealogical descendants of the Oghuz Afshar of the 11th century.

Afshar tribes
List of Afshar tribes are: Alplū, Arašlū, Bekešlū, Gündüzlü, Imirlü, Köse Aḥmedlū, Köselü, Pāpāglū, Qāsemlū, Qereḵlū, Karalu, Karamanlu, Salmanlu, Sindelli, Tur Ali Hacılu, Receplü, Balabanlu, Karabudaklı and Qirqlū.

Afshars in Turkey
Afshars in Turkey mostly live in Sarız, Tomarza and Pınarbaşı districts of Kayseri province, as well as in several villages in Adana, Kahramanmaraş and Gaziantep provinces. 

While Afshars had remained nomadic and retained their Oghuz lifestyle, forced settlements caused them to adopt a settled lifestyle. A resistance against Ottomans under spiritual leadership of the bard Dadaloğlu and local Afshar lord Kozanoğlu was proven futile.

Afshar among the Bozulus
In 1570-71, within the Bozulus, three branches of Diyarbakir Afshars under Mehmed Kethüdâ numbered around 804, 367 and 109. Apart from these, there were many more Afshar branches under the administration of other kethüdas.

In the 17th century, some of Bozulus Afshars migrated to Central Anatolia and settled mostly in Karaman Eyalet. Other ones, especially members of Damascus Turkmens remained in their old settlements. This branch, which is called boz ulus mândesi ('Bozulus remnant') on Ottoman documents, were later settled in Rakka Eyalet, however many of the tribesmen belonging to this community migrated to Western Anatolia.

In 1716, the Köpeklü branch of Bozulus Afshars were seen in Mihaliç kaza. On the other hand, some other Afshars of Bozulus migrated to Iran during the reign of Shah Abbas.

Culture
Several folk dances in Afshar-inhabited areas are known after the name of the tribe. Afshar kaba is danced around the Barak Plain in Gaziantep. Afshar halay or ağırlama ( or ) is known around Kırşehir, Yozgat, Keskin, as well as Kayseri, while Afshar zeybek is found around Burdur, Antalya, Denizli, and Muğla.

Genetics
In an Afshar village near Ankara where, according to oral tradition, the ancestors of the inhabitants came from Central Asia, the researchers found that 57% of the villagers had haplogroup L, 13% had haplogroup Q and 3% had haplogroup N-M231. Examples of haplogroup L, which is most common in South Asia, might be a result of Central Asian migration even though the presence of haplogroup L in Central Asia itself was most likely a result of migration from South Asia. Therefore, Central Asian haplogroups potentially occurred in 73% of males in the village. Furthermore, 10% of the Afshars had haplogroups E3a and E3b, while only 13% had haplogroup J2a, the most common in Turkey.

Afshars in Turkmenistan

During the reign of Nader Shah, a group of Afshars assimilated with a couple of modern Turkmen tribes that currently live in the territory of present-day Turkmenistan, such as Gekleng, Murcheli, Esgi, and Ersary. It is known that they formed a backbone of the Murcheli tribe. The Afshars also played a major role in the formation of the Turkmen tribe of Alili.

List of dynasties with Afshar origin

 Afsharid dynasty
 Ardabil Khanate
 Alaiye
 Aydınids
 Baku Khanate
 Beylik of Lâdik
 Germiyanids
 Karamanids
 Sarukhanids
 Karabakh Khanate

Notable people from the Afshar tribe
Ai-Toghdï
Junayd of Aydın, ruler of Smyrna
Nader Shah, founder of Afsharid dynasty
Nure Sofi, founder of Karamanids
Mirza Muhammad Khan I, founder of Baku Khanate
Zulfaqar Khan Afshar, founder of Zanjan Khanate
Panah Ali Khan, founder of Karabakh Khanate
Dadaloğlu, Turkish ashik
Kâzım Karabekir, Turkish general, politician
Yusuf Halaçoğlu, Turkish historian, politician

See also
 Javanshir clan
 Iranian Turks
 Afshar rugs

Notes

Sources

Further reading
 

Afshar tribe
Turkoman tribes